wd~50 was a molecular gastronomy New American/international restaurant in Manhattan, New York City.  It was opened in 2003 by chef Wylie Dufresne. wd~50 closed November 30, 2014.

Awards and ratings
It was listed among the S. Pellegrino World's 50 Best Restaurants for 2010.  In 2006 the restaurant received a Michelin star in the New York City guide, which it retained until it closed.

In 2013, Zagat gave it a food rating of 25 out of 30.

Closure
On June 10, 2014, The New York Times reported that wd~50 would be closing due to a real estate developer planning on constructing a new building at the site; The restaurant closed on November 30, 2014. The restaurant was located at 50 Clinton Street (between Rivington Street and Stanton Street), on the Lower East Side.

See also
 List of New American restaurants
 List of restaurants in New York City

References

External links
Official website (archived)

Restaurants in Manhattan
Defunct restaurants in New York City
Molecular gastronomy
Restaurants established in 2003
2003 establishments in New York City
2014 disestablishments in New York (state)
Restaurants disestablished in 2014
New American restaurants in New York (state)